La Coupe de l'Outre-Mer de football was a biennial football competition that was created in 2008. It was designed to have the national football teams of the overseas departments and territories of France play against each other. This competition replaces the Coupe des Clubs Champions de l'Outre-Mer that involved clubs from the territories. The first edition took place between 24 September and 4 October 2008 in Île-de-France.

Although scheduled for a 2014 edition, the competition was dissolved in late 2013 after the Fédération Française de Football decided it was too expensive.

Eligible participants

Results

Results

Cumulative results

References

External links
 France - Coupe des DOM 2008

 
International association football competitions hosted by France
l'Outre-Mer
2008 establishments in France
2013 disestablishments in France
Recurring sporting events established in 2008
Recurring sporting events disestablished in 2013